The Missoula Independent was a free weekly alternative newspaper in Missoula, Montana, United States. It was acquired by Lee Enterprises, owner of the daily Missoulian, in 2017. On September 11, 2018, Lee Enterprises shut down the Independent without notice.

The Independent published investigative journalism, political analysis, and critical coverage of local music and culture.  The paper also maintained an events calendar for the Missoula area.  The Independent also published nationally syndicated columns including "News Quirks" by Roland Sweet, "Advice Goddess" by Amy Alkon, "Free Will Astrology" by Rob Brezsny, and several local columns as well.  The paper also published the "Jonesin" crossword puzzle by Matt Jones and the comic strip This Modern World by Tom Tomorrow.  The Independent published a popular "Best of Missoula" issue every year that showcases readers' favorite food, culture, people, and media in the Missoula area.

The Missoula Independent was the largest weekly newspaper in Montana.  It was published on every Thursday, and was delivered throughout western Montana.  As of a 2015 audit, it had a circulation of 20,000 and was distributed from 500 locations.

In 2018, the Independent's non-management employees filed a petition with the National Labor Relations Board to hold an election on whether to affiliate with the News Guild for the purposes of collective bargaining. In a letter sent to staff, general manager and former Independent owner Matt Gibson announced his position to the effort, stating that the newspaper is losing money.

References

External links
 Missoula Independent website
 Association of Alternative Newsweeklies
 

Newspapers published in Montana
Alternative weekly newspapers published in the United States
Mass media in Missoula, Montana
1991 establishments in Montana

2018 disestablishments in Montana